The first Yekhanurov Government was appointed after the first Tymoshenko Government was sacked amid resignations and corruption claims. Twelve days later the Ukrainian Parliament rejecting Ukrainian President Viktor Yushchenko choice of Yuri Yekhanurov for Prime Minister. Yekhanurov was three votes short of the 226 needed for approval with three out of 52 deputies from the Regions faction voting for Yekhanurov. On September 22, 2005 the Ukrainian parliament did approved Yekhanurov appointment with 289 votes. This time all the Parliamentarians of the Party of Regions faction of losing presidential candidate (in 2004) Viktor Yanukovych backed the appointment. This shortly after a "Memorandum Of Understanding Between The Authorities And The Opposition" was signed by Yekhanurov, Yushchenko and Yanukovych.

Yekhanurov government lost a vote of no confidence on January 10, 2006 but stayed in power until the parliamentary election two months later.

Creation

Appointment of Yekhanurov (21-22 September 2005)

Composition

References

Ukrainian governments
2005 establishments in Ukraine
2006 disestablishments in Ukraine
Cabinets established in 2005
Cabinets disestablished in 2006